Ardiz-e Olya (also Romanized as Ardīz-e ‘Olyā; also known as Ardīs and Ardīz-e Bālā) is a village in Kuh Panj Rural District, in the Central District of Bardsir County, Kerman Province, Iran. At the 2006 census, its population was 19, in 4 families.

References 

Populated places in Bardsir County